"Blackbird" is a song by the English rock band the Beatles from their 1968 double album The Beatles (also known as "the White Album"). It was written by Paul McCartney and credited to Lennon–McCartney, and performed as a solo piece by McCartney. When discussing the song, McCartney has said that the lyrics were inspired by hearing the call of a blackbird in Rishikesh, India, and by racial tension in the Southern United States.

Origins

McCartney explained on Chaos and Creation at Abbey Road, aired in 2005, that the guitar accompaniment for "Blackbird" was inspired by Johann Sebastian Bach's Bourrée in E minor, a well-known lute piece, often played on the classical guitar. As teenagers, he and George Harrison tried to learn Bourrée as a "show off" piece. The Bourrée is distinguished by melody and bass notes played simultaneously on the upper and lower strings. McCartney adapted a segment of the Bourrée (reharmonised into the original's relative major key of G) as the opening of "Blackbird", and carried the musical idea throughout the song.

The first night his future wife Linda Eastman stayed at his home, McCartney played "Blackbird" for the fans camped outside his house.

Meaning and interpretation
Since composing "Blackbird" in 1968, McCartney has given various statements regarding both his inspiration for the song and its meaning. He has said that he was inspired by hearing the call of a blackbird one morning when the Beatles were studying Transcendental Meditation in Rishikesh, India and also  writing it in Scotland as a response to racial tensions escalating in the United States during the spring of 1968.

In May 2002, following a show in Dallas, Texas, McCartney discussed the song with KCRW DJ Chris Douridas, saying:

I had been doing some [poetry readings] in the last year or so because I've got a poetry book out called Blackbird Singing, and when I would read "Blackbird", I would always try and think of some explanation to tell the people … So, I was doing explanations, and I actually just remembered why I'd written "Blackbird", you know, that I'd been, I was in Scotland playing on my guitar, and I remembered this whole idea of "you were only waiting for this moment to arise" was about, you know, the black people's struggle in the southern states, and I was using the symbolism of a blackbird. It's not really about a blackbird whose wings are broken, you know, it's a bit more symbolic.

In 2018, McCartney further elaborated on the song's meaning, explaining that "blackbird" should be interpreted as "black girl", in the context of the civil rights troubles in southern 1960s US.

His stepmother, Angie McCartney,  has claimed that McCartney wrote it for her elderly mother, Edith Stopforth, who was staying at Jim McCartney's house while recovering from a long illness. Angie recalled that McCartney visited the house and sat at Edith's bedside, where Edith told him that she would listen to a bird singing at night.

Although McCartney has been consistent in the meaning, there are still varied interpretations – as a nature song, a message in support of the Black Power movement, or a love song. Writing in the 1990s, Ian MacDonald noted the theory that "Blackbird" was intended as "a metaphor for the black civil rights struggle", but pointed to the composition's romantic qualities, arguing that the early-morning bird song "translates … into a succinct metaphor for awakening on a deeper level". However, during an informal rehearsal at EMI Studios on 22 November 1968, before he and Donovan took part in a Mary Hopkin recording session, McCartney played "Blackbird", telling Donovan that he wrote it after having "read something in the paper about the riots" and that he meant the black "bird" to symbolise a black woman.

Along with McCartney's "Helter Skelter", "Blackbird" was one of several White Album songs that Charles Manson interpreted as the Beatles' prophecy of an apocalyptic race war that would lead to him and his "Family" of followers ruling the US on countercultural principles. Manson interpreted the lyrics as a call to black Americans to wage war on their white counterparts, and instructed his followers to commit a series of murders in Los Angeles in August 1969 to trigger such a conflict.

Composition and recording

The song was recorded on 11 June 1968 at EMI's Abbey Road Studios in London, with George Martin as the producer and Geoff Emerick as the audio engineer. It is a solo performance with McCartney playing a Martin D 28 acoustic guitar. The track includes recordings of a male common blackbird singing in the background.

Apart from the blackbird, only three sounds were recorded: McCartney's voice, his guitar, and a tapping that keeps time on the left channel. This tapping "has been incorrectly identified as a metronome in the past", according to engineer Geoff Emerick, who says it is actually the sound of Paul tapping his foot. McCartney also said the same in The Beatles' Anthology documentary. Emerick recalls [Paul's foot-taps, presumably] as being mic'd up separately. Footage included in the bonus content on disc two of the 2009 remaster of the album shows McCartney tapping both his feet alternately while performing the song.

The mono version contains the bird sounds a few seconds earlier than the stereo recording, and was originally issued on a mono incarnation of The Beatles (it has since been issued worldwide as part of The Beatles in Mono CD box set). The song appears on Love with "Yesterday", billed as "Blackbird/Yesterday". "Blackbird" provides an introduction to "Yesterday".

Live performances
In 1973, McCartney included the song, along with the Beatles track "Michelle", as part of his acoustic medley in the television special James Paul McCartney.
Starting with his 1975–76 world tour with the band Wings, McCartney has performed "Blackbird" on every one of his concert tours. A solo performance of the song, followed by "Yesterday", appears on Wings' 1976 live album Wings Over America.

McCartney also included "Blackbird" in his set at the Party at the Palace concert in June 2002. In 2009, McCartney performed the song at the Coachella Valley Music and Arts Festival, commenting prior to singing it on how it had been written in response to the Civil Rights Movement, and added, "It's so great to realise so many civil rights issues have been overcome."

A live version appears in the multi-CD collection Good Evening New York City, which was released in 2009 and recorded inside the American stadium Citi Field.

Legacy
Coinciding with the 50th anniversary of its release, Jacob Stolworthy of The Independent listed "Blackbird" at number five in his ranking of the White Album's 30 tracks. He said that its "beautiful calmness" was at odds with the growing racial tensions that allegedly inspired the song, and concluded: "For many, it's the apotheosis of McCartney's career and remains a standout in his solo live shows." Although the 1985 Mr. Mister song "Broken Wings" contains an identical lyric, "Take these broken wings and learn to fly", Mr. Mister member Richard Page has described this as "a mindless unintentional reference" attributable to songwriter John Lang being inspired by Kahlil Gibran's 1912 book Broken Wings.

Personnel
According to Ian MacDonald:
Paul McCartney – lead vocal, acoustic guitar, tape loops, foot tapping

Charts

Certifications and sales

Cover versions
"Blackbird" was the eighth-most recorded song of all time up to December 2008. Among the most notable examples are:
 "Blackbird" appears on the Crosby, Stills & Nash 1991 box set, having been recorded during the sessions for the album Crosby, Stills & Nash. They performed it often in concert, also at their performance at Woodstock festival 1969 and a live version appeared in 2014 on the CSNY 1974 album.
 For the 2001 film I Am Sam, Sarah McLachlan provided a version of the song, on a soundtrack made up entirely of Beatles covers.
 The Dandy Warhols released a recording of the song in July 2009 after the death of Michael Jackson, fulfilling a promise made in the first and title track of their 2003 album Welcome to the Monkey House ("When Michael Jackson dies, we're coverin' 'Blackbird'"). The line was thought to partially reference Jackson's ownership of the Beatles' back catalogue of songs when he bought Associated Television (ATV), which had previously acquired Northern Songs, in the mid-1980s.
 Sarah Darling recorded the song in November 2011 for the album Let Us In: Nashville – A Tribute to Linda McCartney, and it was released as a single. Darling's version was later featured in the 200th episode of Criminal Minds.
 Dave Grohl performed the song during the In Memoriam tribute at the 88th Academy Awards.

References

Sources
 
 
 
 
 
 Garcia, A. (2018, December 5). Was Paul McCartney's Song “Blackbird” Inspired by the Civil Rights Movement? Snopes.com. https://www.snopes.com/fact-check/blackbird-civil-rights/
 
Ludington Daily News. (2004, May 27). The moment they've waited. Ludington Daily News. https://www.google.com/search?q=Ludington+Daily+News&rlz=1CAJIKU_enUS1021&sourceid=chrome&ie=UTF-8&safe=active&ssui=on

External links

 Full lyrics for the song at the Beatles' official website
 
 

1968 songs
The Beatles songs
Songs written by Lennon–McCartney
Song recordings produced by George Martin
Songs published by Northern Songs
1960s ballads
English folk songs
Folk ballads
Songs about birds
Songs against racism and xenophobia
Popular songs based on classical music